WKMB (1070 AM) is a radio station broadcasting an Urban Gospel radio format. Licensed to Stirling, New Jersey, United States, the station serves Middlesex County.  The station is owned by World Harvest Communications, Inc.

WKMB is a daytimer.  AM 1070 is a clear channel frequency reserved for KNX Los Angeles.  That requires WKMB to sign-off at sunset to avoid interfering.

History
WKMB signed on in February 1972 with an adult contemporary format under the ownership of Herb Michels. It changed to a country music format in 1979; in 2002, WKMB became the only commercial radio station in the New York City area to broadcast country music after a four-station simulcast on 107.1 FM dropped the format for Spanish-language programming. Following Michels' death in 2002, his heirs sold the station to King's Temple Ministries, who converted WKMB to a gospel music station on January 19, 2003. King's Temple Ministries had earlier bought time on WERA before that station shut down in 1997. From 2003 until 2015, WKMB broadcast from WERA's former studios at 120 West 7th Street in Plainfield.

WKMB's license was canceled on June 14, 2017 for not paying debts it owed to the Federal Communications Commission (FCC), which prevented the renewal of the station's license. WKMB returned to the airwaves on July 1, 2017 from studios at 232 East Front Street in Plainfield, after having its license renewal application reinstated by the FCC on June 30.

References

External links

KMB
KMB
Radio stations established in 1972
1972 establishments in New Jersey